A National Reserve is a land designation for protecting conservation values. National Reserve is an umbrella term encompassing many subcategories including managed nature reserves, wildlife reserves, fauna/floral reserves, avian reserves, geological reserves, forest reserves, and even things outside the realm of natural environment like historical preservations and cultural preservations that protect the history and culture of an area like a Native American reservation.

History of Reserves 
National Reserves are a newer concept in retrospect to history. Until the nineteenth century, large areas of land that were set aside were owned by royalty and large private landowners with very few intentions of helping manage or preserve that land. Instead, using it for one’s own leisure. It was not until Henry Thoreau (1817–1862), in his book "Huckleberries", suggested the idea of wildlife areas when he wrote, "Each town should have a park, or rather a primitive forest, of five hundred or a thousand acres, where a stick should never be cut for fuel, a common possession forever, for instruction and recreation.". An idea such as this was far beyond its years, however, in the mid-nineteenth century it began to flourish when families from cities across the country began to seek the relaxing escape of the wilderness.

Benefits of Reserves 
The effects of these reserves are vast and none less important than the next. It is in the name reserve, to protect and preserve the animals, plants, geography, and historical value each one of them has to offer. National reserves offer a healthy amount of biodiversity within its boundaries giving each living organism a chance to play its natural role in the environment. This encompasses anything from trees photosynthesizing producing oxygen to aquatic life cleaning the lakes, rivers, and streams. National Reserves are not limited by all the benefits they have for the wildlife and the environment. They also provide several recreational activities for the millions of tourists they attract every year as well like rock climbing, hiking, sight seeing, biking, camping, and wildlife photography.

National Reserves by country

National Reserve System, Australia
National reserves of Chile
National reserves of New Zealand
National reserves of the United States
List of National Parks and Reserves of Canada

See also
:Category:National reserves of Chile
:Category:National Reserves of the United States

References

Protected areas